Réseau Art Nouveau Network (RANN) was established in 1999 by European cities with a rich art nouveau heritage. Enterprise and commitment are the Network's chief hallmarks; as well as championing a rigorously scientific approach, it aims to keep professionals informed and to make the general public aware of the cultural significance and European dimension of the art nouveau heritage. As of April 2019, the network consists of different institutions from the following cities and regions:

 : Vienna
 : Brussels
 : La Habana
 : Bad Nauheim, Darmstadt
 : Nancy
 : Budapest, Szeged
 : Lombardy, Palermo
 : Riga
 : Ålesund
 : Aveiro
 : Oradea
 : Ljubljana
 : Barcelona, Melilla, Terrassa
 : La Chaux-de-Fonds
 : Glasgow
 : Subotica

Candidate cities
 : Timișoara

References

External links
Réseau Art Nouveau Network, a European network of Art Nouveau cities.
The list of RANN members

Art Nouveau